Miller v. American Telephone & Telegraph Co., 507 F.2d 759 (3d Cir. 1974), is a United States corporate law case that established that a corporate board cannot claim protection of the business judgment rule in a shareholder suit if the decision at issue was a knowing violation of public law.

Facts
American Telephone & Telegraph Co. loaned 1.5 million dollars to the Democratic National Committee in the lead-up to the 1968 election and then did not seek to collect the loan. Certain shareholders sued for waste.

Reasoning
Although the business judgment rule protects corporate board's decisions from second guessing by shareholders or the courts, in this case, the board's decision to "loan" money to the Democratic National Committee was an illegal campaign contribution, in violation of the Tillman Act. The courts found that the decision not to collect on the loan was a knowing decision of the board's, and that it also constituted an illegal campaign contribution. The business judgement rule, therefore, did not protect the board's decision even from a civil suit by shareholders.

References

External links
 

United States corporate case law
United States Court of Appeals for the Third Circuit cases
1974 in United States case law